Petersville is a civil parish in Queens County, New Brunswick, Canada.

For governance purposes it is divided between CFB Gagetown and the local service districts of Wirral-Enniskillen and the parish of Petersville. Wirral-Enniskillen is part of Regional Service Commission 11 (RSC11) and Petersville Parish is part of the Fundy Regional Service Commission (FRSC).

Origin of name
William Francis Ganong states that the parish was named in honour of Harry Peters, then Speaker of the House of Assembly. Peters' tenure as Speaker actually ended in 1827 but he continued to serve as MLA until 1843. Harry's brother Charles Jeffery Peters was Attorney General of New Brunswick when the parish was erected.

History
Petersville was erected in 1838 from Gagetown and Hampstead Parishes.

Much of the parish was expropriated in 1953 for the creation of CFB Gagetown.

Boundaries
Petersville Parish is bounded:

 on the northeast and east within CFB Gagetown by a line beginning at the prolongation of the southwestern line of a grant to Thomas T. Hewlett at the corner of Lawfield and Kerr Roads in Summer Hill, then southwesterly following Lawfield Road to the westernmost corner of a grant to Henry Appleby, then southeasterly along the prolongation of the northeastern line of a grant to Sylvanus Haviland to its easternmost corner, then southwest to the Yorkshire Road, then along Yorkshire Road to the Kings County line;
 on the southeast by the Kings County line;
 on the southwest by the Charlotte County line;
 on the northwest by the Sunbury County line.

Communities
Communities at least partly within the parish. italics indicate a community expropriated for CFB Gagetown

 Armstrong Corner
 Bayard
 Blakely
 Clarendon
 Clones
 Cootes Hill
 Dunns Corner
  Enniskillen
 Ferris
 Fowlers Corners
 Headline
 Loisville
 Olinville
 Petersville
 South Clones
 Summer Hill
 Vincent
  Welsford
 West Jerusalem
  Wirral
 Wirral Station

Bodies of water
Bodies of water at least partly within the parish.

 River George
 West Branch Musquash River
 Brittain Stream
 Crystal Stream
 Cunningham Creek
 more than fifteen officially named lakes

Other notable places
Parks, historic sites, and other noteworthy places at least partly within the parish.
 CFB Gagetown
 Lepreau River Wildlife Management Area
 Loch Alva Protected Natural Area

Demographics

Population
Population trend

Language
Mother tongue (2016)

Access Routes
Highways and numbered routes that run through the parish, including external routes that start or finish at the parish limits:

Highways

Principal Routes

None

External Routes:
None

Notes

References

External links
 Petersville Local Service District-LSD

Parishes of Queens County, New Brunswick
Local service districts of Queens County, New Brunswick